is a public transport organization in Sendai, Japan. The organization operates subways and buses within the city. It was founded in 1926.

Transport
Sendai City Bus
Sendai Airport bus (Discontinued in 2007)
Loople Sendai (A circle line for tourists)
Sendai Subway
Namboku Line
Tōzai Line
Sendai City Tram (Discontinued in 1976)

History

External links
 

Intermodal transport authorities in Japan
Transport in Sendai
Companies based in Sendai
Sendai